Leonidas "Leo" K. Resvanis (1944 in Athens, Greece) is a physicist known for his work with neutrinos. He was a Professor of Physics at the University of Athens from 1976 until he retired and became Emeritus Professor in 2011. He served as the director of the Nestor Project.

He is also the person who suggested to Burton Richter that Richter's new discovery be named the "psi" particle.

Career
Leonidas Resvanis received  his B.Sc. in Physics from the University of Manchester in 1965. He continue his studies in the Johns Hopkins University from  where he received his PhD in High Energy Physics in 1971. His dissertation was entitled "Measurement of the strong interaction form factors in the semileptonic decays of the long lived neutral kaon"

Between 1971 and 1976 he worked in the United States, in the University of Pennsylvania as an assistant professor. In 1976 was elected a full Professor in the University of Athens.

References

20th-century Greek physicists
1944 births
Living people
Alumni of the University of Manchester
Johns Hopkins University alumni
Academic staff of the National and Kapodistrian University of Athens
Scientists from Athens